Sanza is a town and comune in the province of Salerno in the Campania region of southern Italy.

History
It is a small town placed on a hill surrounded by mountains.
In ancient times it was protected by walls and there were few gates to access the village.

Geography
The town is bordered by Buonabitacolo, Casalbuono, Casaletto Spartano, Caselle in Pittari, Monte San Giacomo, Montesano sulla Marcellana, Piaggine, Rofrano, Sassano and Valle dell'Angelo.

Sanza counts the hamlets (frazioni) of San Donato and Varivertola. In the north-western area of its territory is located the mount Cervati.

Feast Day
Sanza's biggest day of the year is August 5; a day in which all of its patrons pay homage to their other beloved saint, La Madonna Della Neve (Mary of the Snows.) In late July, a group of men carrying the heavy statue of La Madonna on their shoulders are followed by the people of Sanza as they ascend Monte Cervati (a nearby mountain in the Cilento region). The statue is then left in the small chapel at the very top. Then several days later, Sanza's devoted people, ranging from young children, to old men and women with walking sticks, once again follow La Madonna's descent back down the mountain. After a 26 kilometer journey ranging from around 2 or 3 am, up until when the people return, all those who had come down the mountain create a procession through the tight cobblestoned streets of Sanza, singing loudly and continuing to carry La Madonna.

Notes and references

See also
Cilento
Vallo di Diano
Cilento National Park
Pruno Cilento
Mount Cervati

External links

Cities and towns in Campania
Localities of Cilento